USS George Washington Carver may refer to ships named in honor of the inventor George Washington Carver:

 , a Liberty ship, launched in May 1943; acquired by the War Department in November 1943, renamed United States Army hospital ship USAHS Dogwood; converted to a troop transport USAT George Washington Carver in January 1946; scrapped in 1964 in Oakland, California.
  was a  fleet ballistic missile submarine commissioned in 1966 and decommissioned in 1993

United States Navy ship names